Sparkassen Cup  may refer to:

 Sparkassen Cup (figure skating), figure skating competition now known as the Bofrost Cup on Ice
 Sparkassen Cup (tennis)
 Sparkassen Cup (athletics)